The Hangashore Folk Festival was a folk festival based in Corner Brook, Newfoundland in 1980–1994. The festival was run by the Bay Of Islands Folk Arts Council.

Many performers played at the festival over the years including Rawlings Cross, Salt And Pepper, Driftwood, Figgy Duff, Tickle Harbour, Rankin Street (Pre Great Big Sea), and Bernie Felix.

The Festival was held in July annually in nearby Prince Edward Park attracting 10,000 patrons at its peak.

References 
Citations

Music festivals established in 1980
Music festivals in Newfoundland and Labrador
Folk festivals in Canada
Corner Brook
1980 establishments in Newfoundland and Labrador